Malaysian Philharmonic Youth Orchestra (MPYO) is the national youth orchestra of Malaysia. The goal of this youth orchestra is to inspire young Malaysian musicians to appreciate orchestral music and to create a pool of well-trained musicians, particularly in classical music.

The first round of auditions were held on 6 May and 6 June 2006. About 500 young instrumentalists aged between 14 and 26 attended the auditions from all across Malaysia. 110 were selected into the newly formed youth orchestra in 2006.

The MPYO performs a wide-ranging of music genre, mainly classical music from the symphonic to commissioned works by Malaysian composers. Todate, it has a total of 106 musicians, participating in concerts, workshops and training throughout the year.

The MPYO made its debut concert at the Petronas Philharmonic Hall on 25 August 2007, led by its first principal conductor, Kevin Field.

Conductors
 Kevin Field (2006–2014) Principal Conductor
 Ciarán McAuley (2014–2016) Resident Conductor
 Harish Shankar (2016–2017) Resident Conductor
 Naohisa Furusawa (2016–present) Resident Conductor
 Gerard Salonga (2018–present) Resident Conductor

See also
 Malaysian Philharmonic Orchestra

See also 
 List of youth orchestras

References

External links
 Malaysian Philharmonic Youth Orchestra (MPYO)

National youth orchestras
Malaysian orchestras
Musical groups established in 2006
2006 establishments in Malaysia